The Evangelical Lutheran Synod of Iowa and Other States, commonly known as the Iowa Synod, was founded on August 24, 1854, at St. Sebald in Clayton County, Iowa. It adopted a constitution and its name, in 1864. The synod was the result of disagreements, in Saginaw, Michigan, against the Missouri Synod that had arisen with some of the pastors sent to America by Johann Konrad Wilhelm Löhe . Some of these pastors joined the Missouri Synod, while pastors Georg M. Grossmann and Johannes Deindoerfer and a small group moved to Iowa.

Most of the congregations of the First Evangelical Lutheran Synod of Texas joined the Iowa Synod as its Texas District in 1896.  In 1930, the Iowa Synod merged with the Ohio Synod and the Buffalo Synod to form the American Lutheran Church (ALC). The latter body, after further mergers, became part of the Evangelical Lutheran Church in America in 1988.

In 1929, just before its merger into the ALC, the Iowa Synod had 637 pastors, 932 congregations, and 150,683 members.

Notes

References

History of Christianity in the United States
Evangelical Lutheran Church in America predecessor churches
Lutheran denominations in North America
Religious organizations established in 1854
Lutheran denominations established in the 19th century
1854 establishments in Iowa